The  was a one-member party run by , an Iron Chef judge and former member of the House of Representatives.

See also
Manabu Miyazaki:He is the president of this party

External links
 Kurimoto's website 
 Kurimoto's website

Defunct political parties in Japan
ja:電脳突破党